Onésiphore Carbonneau (June 17, 1852 – February 25, 1932) was a Canadian merchant and political figure in Quebec. He represented L'Islet in the House of Commons of Canada from 1902 to 1904 as a Liberal.

He was born in Berthier-en-Bas, Canada East, the son of J.O. Carbonneau and Soulange Dion, and was educated there. In 1874, he married Adele Turgeon. Carbonneau ran unsuccessfully for the Montmagny seat in the House of Commons in 1878. He was first elected to the House of Commons in a 1902 by-election held after Alphonse Arthur Miville Déchêne was named to the Canadian senate. He was defeated when he ran for reelection in 1904.

Electoral record

References 

Members of the House of Commons of Canada from Quebec
Liberal Party of Canada MPs
French Quebecers
1852 births
1932 deaths